Cruzália is a municipality in the state of São Paulo in Brazil. The population is 2,046 (2020 est.) in an area of 149 km². The elevation is 318 m.

References

Municipalities in São Paulo (state)